Tong Zhipeng (12 August 1924 – 19 December 2017) was a Chinese telecommunications engineer.

He was born in Cixi, Zhejiang and earned a bachelor's degree from Shanghai Jiao Tong University before receiving a doctorate from the University of Wisconsin. Tong returned to China and helped develop the nation's telecommunications infrastructure. He was elected an academician of the Chinese Academy of Engineering in 1997.

References

1924 births
2017 deaths
National Chiao Tung University (Shanghai) alumni
University of Wisconsin–Madison alumni
Scientists from Ningbo
Members of the Chinese Academy of Engineering
Engineers from Zhejiang
Chinese expatriates in the United States